Elaine Bland Baxter (January 16, 1933 – March 26, 2021) was an American politician and educator who served as the 27th Iowa Secretary of State.

Personal life
She was the daughter of Clarence Arthur Bland and Margaret Clark Bland.
She married Harry Youngs Baxter, in 1954; they have three children, Katherine, Harry and John. She died on March 26, 2021, aged 88.

Education
She received her B.A. in International Affairs from the University of Illinois in 1954, a teaching certificate in secondary level Social Studies from Iowa Wesleyan College in 1970 and an M.S. in Urban and Regional Planning from the University of Iowa in 1978. She also received graduate training at the Harvard University Kennedy School of Government.

Political career
Baxter was a member of the Iowa House of Representatives' 60th District from 1983 to 1986, and she served two terms as Iowa Secretary of State from 1986 to 1994.

She was also a delegate to Democratic National Convention from Iowa in 1988 and 1992; was a member of the Democratic National Committee from Iowa in 1988; was a candidate for U.S. Representative from Iowa's 3rd congressional district in 1992 and 1994.

Iowa Governor Thomas Vilsack appointed her to the Humanities Iowa board of directors.  She joined the Iowa Lottery Board in 2002.

Baxter endorsed Hillary Clinton in the 2008 US Presidential election.

Community involvement

Baxter was active in civic organizations, including the Burlington planning commission, the Burlington City Council and the Victorian Society of Iowa. She served on various boards, including the Preservation Action, Washington, D.C. (1980–1984), the Iowa Alliance for Historic Preservation, the Heritage Trust for Preservation of Historic Burlington and the Terrace Hill Society.

References

External links 
 Baxter at The Political Graveyard
 Elaine Baxter at Our Campaigns
 Elaine Baxter at the University of Iowa
 Elain Baxter's boardmember listing at the Iowa Lottery board
 Clinton Campaign: Former Lieutenant Governor Jo Ann Zimmerman joins Iowa women elected officials in endorsing Hillary Clinton, IowaPolitics.com
 "Women Not Winning In Iowa: Part 1", John Deeth blog, March 22, 2005
 

Secretaries of State of Iowa
1933 births
2021 deaths
Politicians from Chicago
University of Illinois Urbana-Champaign alumni
Iowa Wesleyan University alumni
University of Iowa alumni
Harvard Kennedy School alumni
Women state legislators in Iowa
Democratic Party members of the Iowa House of Representatives
21st-century American women